David Charles Waddington, Baron Waddington,  (2 August 1929 – 23 February 2017) was a British politician and barrister.

A member of the Conservative Party, he served as a Member of Parliament (MP) in the House of Commons from 1968 to 1974 and 1979 to 1990, and was then made a life peer in the House of Lords. During his parliamentary career, Waddington worked in government as Chief Whip, then as Home Secretary and finally as Leader of the House of Lords. He then served as the Governor of Bermuda between 1992 and 1997.

Early life
Waddington was born in Burnley, Lancashire, the youngest of five. His father and grandfather were both solicitors in Burnley. He was educated at Cressbrook School and Sedbergh School, both independent schools.

He then attended Hertford College, Oxford, where he became President of the Oxford University Conservative Association. He was called to the Bar at Gray's Inn in 1951.

Waddington unsuccessfully defended Stefan Kiszko at Leeds Crown Court in July 1976, in what would become one of the worst and most notorious miscarriages of justice in British Law in the 20th Century. Kiszko served 16 years in prison after wrongly being found guilty of the murder of Lesley Molseed. He died of a massive heart attack 20 months after he was fully released. The real murderer was eventually convicted in 2007.

Political career
Waddington stood for election several times before being successful. He was the Conservative candidate at Farnworth in the 1955 general election, at Nelson and Colne in 1964, and at Heywood and Royton in 1966.

He was first elected to Parliament at the 1968 Nelson and Colne by-election, caused by the death of Labour MP Sydney Silverman. He was re-elected there in 1970 and in February 1974, but lost his seat at the October 1974 general election by a margin of 669 votes to Labour's Doug Hoyle.

Waddington was returned to Parliament for Clitheroe at a by-election in March 1979, and was subsequently elected for the broadly similar Ribble Valley constituency in 1983.

In government
A junior minister under Margaret Thatcher, Waddington was a Lord Commissioner of the Treasury and Government Whip (1979–81), Parliamentary Under-Secretary at the Department of Employment (1981–83), Minister of State at the Home Office (1983–87), and Chief Whip from 1987 until his elevation to Cabinet level in 1989, when he became Home Secretary. On Monday 5 November 1990, he was the guest-of-honour at the annual dinner of the Conservative Monday Club

Life peer
On 4 December 1990, he was created a life peer as Baron Waddington, of Read in the County of Lancashire. He served as Lord Privy Seal and Leader of the House of Lords until 1992. He then served as Governor of Bermuda from 1992 until 1997.

Lord Waddington was appointed a Knight Grand Cross of the Royal Victorian Order (GCVO) in 1994. In 2008, his amendment to the Criminal Justice and Immigration Bill, known as the Waddington Amendment, inserted a freedom of speech clause into new anti-homophobic hate crime legislation.

In November 2009, the Government failed to repeal the Waddington Amendment in the Coroners and Justice Bill. On 26 March 2015, Lord Waddington retired from the House of Lords pursuant to Section 1 of the House of Lords Reform Act 2014.

Personal life
Waddington married Gillian Rosemary Green (born 1939), the daughter of Alan Green, on 20 December 1958. The couple had three sons and two daughters.

Lord Waddington died of pneumonia on 23 February 2017, at his home in South Cheriton, Somerset, aged 87.

Arms

References

External links
 Profile on Parliament website
 

1929 births
2017 deaths
People from Burnley
Alumni of Hertford College, Oxford
British Secretaries of State
English King's Counsel
Conservative Party (UK) MPs for English constituencies
Conservative Party (UK) life peers
Deputy Lieutenants of Lancashire
Governors of Bermuda
Knights Grand Cross of the Royal Victorian Order
Leaders of the House of Lords
Lords Privy Seal
Members of Gray's Inn
Members of the Privy Council of the United Kingdom
People educated at Sedbergh School
Presidents of the Oxford University Conservative Association
20th-century King's Counsel
Secretaries of State for the Home Department
UK MPs 1966–1970
UK MPs 1970–1974
UK MPs 1974
UK MPs 1974–1979
UK MPs 1979–1983
UK MPs 1983–1987
UK MPs 1987–1992
Life peers created by Elizabeth II